Solitalea is a genus from the family of Sphingobacteriaceae.

References

Further reading 
 

Sphingobacteriia
Bacteria genera